Publius Cornelius Dolabella (fl. 1st century BC) was a Roman senator who was appointed suffect consul in 35 BC with Titus Peducaeus as his colleague.

Biography

Early life
A member of the patrician Dolabella branch of the gens Cornelia, Dolabella was probably the descendant of Gnaeus Cornelius Dolabella, who was Urban praetor in 81 BC. His father may have been Publius Cornelius Dolabella the consul of 44 BC.

He may have been the man who informed Cleopatra of Octavian's plans when he had captured her.

Career
Much of his career is unknown; based on a series of rare and enigmatic bronze coins, it has been postulated that he may have been a triumvir monetalis in Sicily at some early point in his career. Appointed consul suffectus in 35 BC to replace Sextus Pompeius, it is not known whether he was a partisan of Gaius Julius Caesar Octavianus or Marcus Antonius. He also perhaps may have been the Dolabella who accompanied Augustus to Gaul between 16 – 13 BC.

Personal life
It is speculated that Dolabella married a Quinctilia, a sister of Publius Quinctilius Varus, and that their son was Publius Cornelius Dolabella, who was Roman consul in AD 10.

References

Sources
 Tansey, Patrick, "The Perils of Prosopography: The Case of the Cornelii Dolabellae", Zeitschrift für Papyrologie und Epigraphik, 130 (2000), pp. 265–271

1st-century BC Roman consuls
Senators of the Roman Republic
Roman governors of Asia
Year of birth unknown
Year of death unknown
Dolabella, Publius
Roman patricians